The 2000 Wirral Metropolitan Borough Council election took place on 4 May 2000 to elect members of Wirral Metropolitan Borough Council in England. This election was held on the same day as other local elections.

After the election, the composition of the council was:

Election results

Overall election result

Overall result compared with 1999.

Ward results

Bebington

Bidston

Birkenhead

Bromborough

Clatterbridge

Claughton

Eastham

Egerton

Heswall

Hoylake

Leasowe

Liscard

Moreton

New Brighton

Oxton

Prenton

Royden

Seacombe

Incumbent councillor for Bromborough and leader of the council Dave Jackson died in April 2000, days before he was due to stand, causing the election to be delayed.

Thurstaston

Tranmere

Upton

Wallasey

Changes between 2000 and 2002

Notes

• italics denote the sitting councillor • bold denotes the winning candidate

References

2000 English local elections
2099
2000s in Merseyside